Franck Verzy (born 13 May 1961) is a retired French high jumper, born in Lyon.

He finished 20th at the 1982 European Indoor Championships and won the bronze medal at the 1983 Mediterranean Games. He also competed at the 1982 European Championships, the 1983 World Championships and the 1984 Olympic Games without reaching the final.

Verzy became French champion in 1982, 1984 and 1986. His personal best was 2.32 metres, achieved in 1983.

References

1961 births
Living people
Athletes from Lyon
French male high jumpers
Athletes (track and field) at the 1984 Summer Olympics
Olympic athletes of France
World Athletics Championships athletes for France
Athletes (track and field) at the 1983 Mediterranean Games
Mediterranean Games bronze medalists for France
Mediterranean Games medalists in athletics
20th-century French people